James Tomalin is a British composer and music producer. He studied music at Cambridge University and at Goldsmiths College, and has written music for BBC TV, Channel 4, ITV and numerous films and albums. He currently runs the independent production company  Oxford Digital Media.

External links
 James Tomalin's Lime Music website.
 James Tomalin's Oxford Digital Media website.

English film score composers
English male film score composers
Alumni of Goldsmiths, University of London
Year of birth missing (living people)
Living people
Alumni of the University of Cambridge